Muya may refer to:

Geography
Muya language, Tibetan regions of China
Muya Station (撫養駅, Muya-eki) Naruto, Japan
Muya, Democratic Republic of the Congo, village
Muya Wayin (Quechua "garden house") mountain
Muya (river)  (Russian: Муя) is a 365-kilometre (227 mi) long tributary of the Vitim in Buryatia, Russia
Northern Muya Range, Russia
Southern Muya Range, Russia

People
Guy Muya (1983), Belgian basketball player
Guy Kabeya Muya (1970), Democratic Republic of the Congo filmmaker
Michael Muya (1975),  Kenyan professional  boxer
Rose Tata-Muya (1960),  Kenyan 400m hurdler

Music 
 "MUYA" or "M.U.Y.A." for "Metal Up Your Ass", an early 1982 demo tape by Metallica